130 William is an , residential high-rise tower located in the Financial District of Manhattan. The building was developed by Lightstone and designed by Ghanaian-British architect Sir David Adjaye.

History
Lightstone purchased the former 12-story office building at 130 William Street in May 2014 for $60 million after the previous owner defaulted on a mortgage from East West Bank. However, new plans filed in early 2017 removed the hotel portion and increased the building's size to its current height.

In March 2017, the project secured $305 million in financing and began construction. Facade installation began in October 2018. The building topped-out in May 2019. 130 William has also been recognized as the fastest selling luxury condominium development in New York City in 2018 and 2019.

Architecture and design
130 William's custom hand-cast façade features large-scale arched windows and bronzed detailing.

130 William is adjacent to the Fulton Center transit hub of the New York City Subway. The building is also immediately adjacent to Tribeca, South Street Seaport, the Brooklyn Bridge.

See also
List of tallest buildings in New York City

References

Proposed buildings and structures in New York City
Residential buildings in Manhattan
David Adjaye buildings